Old lady Shapoklyak is a popular villain from a story about Gena the Crocodile written by Russian writer Eduard Uspensky. Her first appearance in the movie was in the animated film Gena the Crocodile (1969) by Roman Kachanov (Soyuzmultfilm studio).

She appears as an old woman, wearing an outdated hat and carrying a purse, in which she carries her pet rat Lariska. Her name is the word for the hat she wears, borrowed from the French chapeau claque, an obsolete spring-loaded top hat, which sounds funny to the Russian ear. In the film Cheburashka Goes to School (1983) she admits that she has not received secondary education and is sent to school together with Cheburashka.

External links

Shapoklyak at Animator.ru

Soviet animation
Animated characters
Fictional con artists